Swiss Dynamic Shooting Federation (SVDS) is the Swiss association for practical shooting under the International Practical Shooting Confederation. Switzerland hosted the first IPSC Handgun World Shoot in 1975.

See also 
 Swiss Handgun Championship
 Swiss Shooting Sport Federation, another shooting sport organization based in Switzerland

External links 
 Official homepage of the Swiss Dynamic Shooting Federation

References 

Regions of the International Practical Shooting Confederation
Practical Shooting